Qarah Qobad and Qareh Qobad may refer to:

Qarah Qobad, Alborz
Qarah Qobad, Qazvin